Katrina Adams and Larisa Neiland were the defending champions but did not compete that year.

Els Callens and Julie Halard-Decugis won in the final 2–6, 6–4, 6–4 against Lisa Raymond and Rennae Stubbs.

Seeds
Champion seeds are indicated in bold text while text in italics indicates the round in which those seeds were eliminated. The top four seeded teams received byes into the second round.

Draw

Final

Top half

Bottom half

External links
 1998 DFS Classic Doubles Draw

Birmingham Classic (tennis)
1998 WTA Tour